Datuk Seri Panglima Haji Lajim Ukin (15 June 1955 – 29 August 2021) was a Malaysian politician. He was the Member of Parliament (MP) for the Beaufort constituency in Sabah from 2008 to 2013, the Deputy Minister of Transport from 2008 to 2009, and the Deputy Minister for Housing and Local Government from 2009 to 2012; in the federal Barisan Nasional (BN) coalition government. Lajim previously served as Deputy Chief Minister of Sabah for three terms from 1999. He was also the Leader of the Opposition in the Sabah State Legislative Assembly (2013–2016). Lajim was the Malaysian United Indigenous Party (BERSATU) supreme council member and also Amanah Ikhtiar Malaysia (AIM) executive chairman at the time of his death in 2021.

Political career 
Before entering federal politics, Lajim was a prominent figure in Sabah state politics. He was a member of the United Sabah Party (PBS) before defecting to United Malays National Organisation (UMNO) in 1994. He later served as Deputy Chief Minister in the Sabah government.

Lajim was elected to Parliament in the 2008 election, as a member of the United Malays National Organisation (UMNO) in the seat of Beaufort. He was subsequently appointed Deputy Minister for Transport, moving to the portfolio of Housing and Local Government in 2009. In July 2012, he renounced his official positions in UMNO to align himself with the Pakatan Rakyat (PR) opposition coalition. This resulted in the revocation of his appointment as a deputy minister. He recontested his parliamentary seat of Beaufort in the 2013 election on a People's Justice Party (PKR) ticket, but was defeated. While losing his federal seat, he won the election for the Sabah State Legislative Assembly seat of Klias. He became the leader of the opposition in the State Assembly.

On 2 October 2016, Lajim resigned from PKR along with two other Pakatan Harapan (PH) assemblymen. He has stated his intention to form a new Sabah-based party and ally with the former Sabah UMNO leader, Shafie Apdal. He later decided to establish a separate party from Shafie, known as Sabah People's Hope Party (PHRS), which was finally approved by Registrar of Societies (RoS) on 25 October 2016. PHRS was dissolved to let its party members be absorbed into Malaysian United Indigenous Party (BERSATU) in 2019. After being absorbed, he became BERSATU Sabah Election Director before being appointed a BERSATU Supreme Council member for the term 2019 to 2022.

Lajim is also known to default on his promises. After commissioning a ghostwriter to write a book about the history of his political party, he failed to deliver on his promises to pay the writer and printing costs, leaving the writer in debt with unsold books. This is thought to be one of the factors that eroded the voters' confidence in the ruling coalition that his party belongs to, culminating in the results of 2020 Kimanis by-election, which saw the opposition coalition BN win, defeating the three-way coalition containing PH, which incorporates BERSATU.

Personal life 
Lajim was married to Normilah Siong. The couple divorced sometime later.

In early 2017, Lajim was injured after falling from a train car on the way to attend a wedding. He was then referred to a local traditional Chinese medicine (TCM) practitioner or "sinseh" and was advised to rest for one week.

In 2021, Lajim was screened and tested positive for COVID-19 at Gleneagles Hospital Kota Kinabalu on 1 August before his admission to KPJ Sabah Specialist Hospital on 13 August. With a history of chronic illnesses, including a kidney transplant and heart ailment, he was later placed under an induced coma after his health deteriorated on 24 August afternoon. On 29 August at 6.23 am, Lajim aged 66 died due to COVID-19 pandemic complications. His remains were brought to his hometown at Kampung Kebatu Beaufort for last rites and burial.

Election results

Honours

Honours of Malaysia
  :
  Companion of the Order of the Defender of the Realm (JMN) (1997)
  :
  Knight Commander of the Order of Malacca (DCSM) – Datuk Wira (2010)
  :
  Commander of the Order of Kinabalu (PGDK) – Datuk (1989)
  Grand Commander of the Order of Kinabalu (SPDK) – Datuk Seri Panglima (1998)

See also
 List of deaths due to COVID-19 - notable individual deaths

References 

1955 births
2021 deaths
People from Sabah
Kadazan-Dusun people
Malaysian political party founders
Leaders of political parties in Malaysia
United Sabah Party politicians
Former United Malays National Organisation politicians
Former People's Justice Party (Malaysia) politicians
Sabah People's Hope Party politicians
Malaysian United Indigenous Party politicians
Members of the Dewan Rakyat
Members of the Sabah State Legislative Assembly
Leaders of the Opposition in the Sabah State Legislative Assembly
Grand Commanders of the Order of Kinabalu
Commanders of the Order of Kinabalu
Companions of the Order of the Defender of the Realm
Deaths from the COVID-19 pandemic in Malaysia
21st-century Malaysian politicians